The women's 3000 metres walk event  at the 1994 European Athletics Indoor Championships was held in Palais Omnisports de Paris-Bercy on 11 March. This was the last time that this event was contested at the European Athletics Indoor Championships.

Medalists

Results

Heats
First 4 from each heat (Q) and the next 4 fastest (q) qualified for the final.

Final

References

Racewalking at the European Athletics Indoor Championships
Walk
1994 in women's athletics